Dog's Head Bay is a 1999 Australian television series co-written by David Williamson on the ABC. It was about a criminal lawyer, Alex Santorini, who buys a house in the sleepy coastal town of Dog's Head Bay. One of the stars was Shane Withington, who later called the show "the worst piece of television in the history of Australia".

Cast
Gary Sweet as  Alex Santorini 
Susan Lyons as Vicki Santorini
Sebastian Goldspink as Nicholas Santorini
Shane Withington as Bob Grant
Sarah Peirse as Jenny Grant
Rachael Coopes as Amanda
Vic Rooney as Bert
Dai Paterson as Todd
Jeff Truman as Mike
Roy Billing as Franco Poreini

References

External links

Dog's Head Bay at Australian Television

1999 Australian television series debuts
1999 Australian television series endings
Australian Broadcasting Corporation original programming
Australian comedy television series